Qaleh-ye Nazer (also Romanized as Qal‘eh-ye Nāz̧er, Qal‘eh Nazar, and Qal‘eh Nāz̧er) is a village in Karvan-e Olya Rural District, Karvan District, Tiran and Karvan County, Isfahan Province, Iran. At the 2006 census, its population was 1,241, in 315 families.

References 

Populated places in Tiran and Karvan County